Viscount Leverhulme, of the Western Isles in the Counties of Inverness and Ross and Cromarty, was a title in the Peerage of the United Kingdom created in 1922 for the industrialist and philanthropist William Lever, 1st Baron Leverhulme. He had already been created a baronet, of Thornton Manor in the parish of Thornton Hough in the County of Chester, in the Baronetage of the United Kingdom in 1911, and Baron Leverhulme, of Bolton-le-Moors in the County Palatine of Lancaster, in 1917, also in the Peerage of the United Kingdom.

His grandson, the third Viscount, was Lord-Lieutenant of Cheshire between 1949 and 1990 and Chancellor of the University of Liverpool from 1980 until 1993. The Philip Leverhulme Equine Hospital at Liverpool Veterinary School is named after him. He had three daughters but no sons and on his death in 2000 the titles became extinct.

The hulme section of the title was in honour of the 1st Viscount's wife, Elizabeth Hulme.

Lever baronets, of Thornton Manor (1911)
Sir William Hesketh Lever, 1st Baronet (1851–1925) (created Baron Leverhulme in 1917)

Barons Leverhulme (1917)
William Hesketh Lever, 1st Baron Leverhulme (1851–1925) (created Viscount Leverhulme in 1922)

Viscounts Leverhulme (1922)
William Hesketh Lever, 1st Viscount Leverhulme (1851–1925)
William Hulme Lever, 2nd Viscount Leverhulme (1888–1949)
Philip William Bryce Lever, 3rd Viscount Leverhulme (1915–2000)

Arms

References

Extinct viscountcies in the Peerage of the United Kingdom
Noble titles created in 1922
Noble titles created for UK MPs
Lever family